William A. Graham (May 15, 1926 – September 12, 2013) was an American television and film director.

Career
Beginning in 1958, Graham worked as a prolific television director; he helmed episodes for dozens of series including Kraft Television Theatre, Omnibus, Checkmate, Naked City, Breaking Point, 12 O'Clock High, The F.B.I., The Fugitive, Batman, CBS Playhouse, and The X-Files. In 1980, he was nominated for a Primetime Emmy Award for directing the television film Guyana Tragedy: The Story of Jim Jones.

In addition to his television work, Graham directed films, such as Honky (1971), Where the Lilies Bloom (1974), and Return to the Blue Lagoon (1991), the latter of which starred Milla Jovovich in an early role. He is known for directing American singer and actor Elvis Presley's final film, Change of Habit (1969).

References

External links
 
 

1926 births
2013 deaths
American television directors
Film directors from New York City
Yale University alumni
Neighborhood Playhouse School of the Theatre alumni
Deaths from pneumonia in California